This is the complete list of Olympic medalists in synchronized swimming.

Current program

Duet

Team

Discontinued events

Solo

Athletes
The following table shows the most successful athletes in Olympic artistic swimming by medals won:

Age records

See also
List of Olympic medalists in artistic swimming by age

References

General

Specific

Synchronized swimming
medalists

Lists of swimming medalists